Calaisa is a quartet from the town of Malmö in Sweden. It consists of the sisters, Caisa and Lisa Troedsson and the sisters Malin and Anna Törnquist. The band participated at Melodifestivalen 2008 with the song If I Could, which was knocked out during the Karlskrona competition on 1 March 2008.

Calaisa has released several albums.

Discography

Albums
 Calaisa - 2006
 Grafton Street - 2009
 Up to Us - 2012

References

External links
 Calaisa
Trelleborgs Allehanda 2009, från  kulturgymnasiet Heleneholm, Malmö

Swedish country music groups
Melodifestivalen contestants of 2008